An edgelord is a pretentious poseur on the Internet who tries to impress or shock by posting edgy opinions such as nihilism or extremist views.

The term is a blend of "edgy" and "shitlord" – a person who "basks in the bitterness and misery of others".

Merriam-Webster gave the following example:

Edgelords were characterised by author Rachel Monroe in her account of criminal behaviour, Savage Appetites:

It is frequently associated with the forum site 4chan.

See also
 Épater la bourgeoisie
 Shock jock
 Shock site

References

 Internet terminology
 Pejorative terms for people